9223 Leifandersson, provisional designation , is a background asteroid from the inner regions of the asteroid belt, approximately 4.5 kilometers in diameter. It was discovered on 18 December 1995, by astronomers of the  Spacewatch program at Kitt Peak National Observatory in Arizona, United States. The asteroid was named in memory of Swedish astronomer Leif Erland Andersson. The assumed stony asteroid has a rotation period of 3.758 hours.

Orbit and classification 

Leifandersson is a non-family asteroid of the main belt's background population when applying the Hierarchical Clustering Method to its proper orbital elements. It has also been classified as a member of the Flora family, a giant asteroid family and the largest family of stony asteroids in the main-belt. It orbits the Sun in the inner asteroid belt at a distance of 2.1–2.5 AU once every 3 years and 6 months (1,275 days; semi-major axis of 2.30 AU). Its orbit has an eccentricity of 0.07 and an inclination of 3° with respect to the ecliptic.

Physical characteristics 

Leifandersson  is an assumed stony S-type asteroid.

Rotation period 

In February 2011, a rotational lightcurve of Leifandersson was obtained from photometric observations by astronomers at the Palomar Transient Factory in California. Lightcurve analysis gave a rotation period of 3.758 hours with a brightness amplitude of 0.33 magnitude.

Diameter and albedo 

According to the survey carried out by the NEOWISE mission of NASA's Wide-field Infrared Survey Explorer, Leifandersson measures 4.498 kilometers in diameter and its surface has an albedo of 0.3810. The Collaborative Asteroid Lightcurve Link assumes an albedo of 0.24 – derived from 8 Flora, the parent body of the Flora family – and calculates a diameter of 4.64 kilometers based on an absolute magnitude of 13.83.

Naming 

This minor planet was named after Swedish astronomer Leif Erland Andersson (1943–1979), who calculated the first observable transits of Pluto and Charon and also co-produced a catalogue of lunar craters. The approved naming citation was published by the Minor Planet Center on 24 January 2000. The lunar crater Andersson was also named in his memory.

References

External links 
 Asteroid Lightcurve Database (LCDB), query form (info )
 Dictionary of Minor Planet Names, Google books
 Asteroids and comets rotation curves, CdR – Observatoire de Genève, Raoul Behrend
 Discovery Circumstances: Numbered Minor Planets (5001)-(10000) – Minor Planet Center
 
 

009223
009223
Named minor planets
19951218